Lance Yednock is a Democratic member of the Illinois House of Representatives for the 76th district which includes Bureau, LaSalle, DeKalb County, Illinois, Putnam and Livingston counties in north central Illinois. Yednock was sworn in to office on January 9, 2019. Yednock, a business representative with International Union of Operating Engineers Local 150, defeated one term incumbent Jerry Lee Long in the 2018 general election. He has a degree from Northern Illinois University.

As of July 3, 2022, Representative Yednock is a member of the following Illinois House committees:

 Agriculture & Conservation Committee (HAGC)
 Labor & Commerce Committee (HLBR)
 Public Utilities Committee (HPUB)
 Small Cell Subcommittee (HPUB-SCEL)
 Transportation: Vehicles & Safety Committee (HVES)
 (Chairman of) Utilities Subcommittee (HPUB-UTIL)
 Veterans' Affairs Committee (HVET)

Electoral history

References

21st-century American politicians
American builders
People from Ottawa, Illinois
Democratic Party members of the Illinois House of Representatives
Year of birth missing (living people)
Living people
Northern Illinois University alumni